The 1978 All-Ireland Under-21 Hurling Championship was the 15th staging of the All-Ireland Under-21 Hurling Championship since its establishment by the Gaelic Athletic Association in 1964.

Kilkenny entered the championship as the defending champions, however, they were defeated in the provincial series.

On 29 October 1978, Galway won the championship following a 3-15 to 2-08 defeat of Tipperary in a replay of the All-Ireland final. This was their second All-Ireland title in the under-21 grade and their first in six championship seasons.

Results

Leinster Under-21 Hurling Championship

Final

Munster Under-21 Hurling Championship

First round

Semi-finals

Finals

All-Ireland Under-21 Hurling Championship

Semi-finals

Finals

Championship statistics

Miscellaneous

 Offaly win the Leinster title for the first time in their history.
 The All-Ireland semi-final clash between Galway and Offaly is their very first meeting in the history of the championship.

References

Under
All-Ireland Under-21 Hurling Championship